Wallmark is a Swedish surname. Notable people with the surname include:

 Gösta Wallmark (1928–2017), Swedish artist
 Hans Wallmark (born 1965), Swedish politician
 J. Torkel Wallmark (1919–2007), Swedish electrical engineer
 Kjell Junior Wallmark (born 1981), better known as Brolle, Swedish singer and musician
 Lucas Wallmark (born 1995), Swedish ice hockey player
 Marcus Wallmark (born 1991), Swedish ice hockey player
 Otto Wallmark (1830-1901), American businessman politician

Swedish-language surnames